Rohitha Rajapaksa (born 15 June 1989) is a Sri Lankan and media personality. He is the youngest son of Sri Lanka's former President Mahinda Rajapaksa. He has two elder brothers – Namal and Yoshitha.

He was a member of the Sri Lanka Navy Rugby team.

He attended S Thomas college in Mt.Lavinia, and completed his bachelor's degree in engineering in Aeronautical Engineering. Later his Masters in Engineering in Space System Engineering from University of Southampton. He obtained a M.Phil. in Mathematical Optimization of Space Debris Mitigation and Strategy Analysis From the University of Colombo.

He made his List A cricket debut on 27 October 2021, for Kalutara Town Club in the 2021–22 Major Clubs Limited Over Tournament.

See also
 Rajapaksa family

References

External links
 

1989 births
Living people
Sri Lankan cricketers
Sri Lankan rugby union players
Kalutara Town Club cricketers
Cricketers from Colombo
Rajapaksa family